Romy Tschopp (born 14 October 1993) is a Swiss para-snowboarder in the SB-LL2 category.

Life and career 
At the 2021 World Para Snow Sports Championships held in Lillehammer, Norway, Tschopp, along with Ellen Walther, won the bronze medal in the women's team event. She competed for Switzerland in snowboarding at the 2022 Winter Paralympics in Beijing, China. She competed in the women's snowboard cross SB-LL2 and women's banked slalom SB-LL2 events.

References

External links 

1993 births
Living people
Swiss female snowboarders
Snowboarders at the 2022 Winter Paralympics
Paralympic snowboarders of Switzerland
21st-century Swiss women